On 6 April 2008, 15 people were killed by an alleged suicide bomber, who exploded himself at the start of a marathon race which was part of the Sinhala and Tamil New Year celebration in Weliweriya town, Sri Lanka. Sri Lanka's national athletics coach Lakshman de Alwis, politician Jeyaraj Fernandopulle, former Olympics runner K.A. Karunaratne and army officer Lt Colonel Udayadeera were killed in the bombing which wounded 90 others. The Sri Lankan Government has blamed the Tamil Tigers for this attack because Minister Fernandopulle was a vocal critic of the Tamil Tigers.

Investigation 
Scene of Crime Officers (SOCO) of the Criminal Investigation Department were able to identify the bomber as a Tamil that carried an identity card with a Muslim name and further investigations found that he had another identity card with a Tamil name to open a bank account to facilitate his expenses. This allowed the CID to trace his accomplices, including the handler but the handler had escaped to LTTE controlled areas while another female Tamil arrested for questioning committed suicide by swallowing a cyanide capsule she had hidden inside her vagina.

References

External links
 Explosion caught on tape

2008 crimes in Sri Lanka
Attacks on civilians attributed to the Liberation Tigers of Tamil Eelam
Massacres in Sri Lanka
Filmed deaths in sports
Liberation Tigers of Tamil Eelam attacks in Eelam War IV
Mass murder in 2008
Suicide bombings in Sri Lanka
Terrorist incidents in Sri Lanka in 2008
Filmed murder–suicides
Attacks during the New Year celebrations